Międzyodrze-Wyspa Pucka is a municipal neighbourhood of the city of Szczecin, Poland situated on the islands between the West Oder river and East Oder River (Regalica), south-east of the Szczecin Old Town, and west of Szczecin-Dąbie. As of January 2011 it had a population of 1,098.

See also
Międzyodrze

References

Neighbourhoods of Szczecin